Marcel Jobin (born 3 January 1942) is a Canadian racewalker. He competed in the men's 20 kilometres walk at the 1976 Summer Olympics and the 1984 Summer Olympics.

References

1942 births
Living people
Athletes (track and field) at the 1971 Pan American Games
Athletes (track and field) at the 1975 Pan American Games
Athletes (track and field) at the 1976 Summer Olympics
Athletes (track and field) at the 1978 Commonwealth Games
Athletes (track and field) at the 1979 Pan American Games
Athletes (track and field) at the 1982 Commonwealth Games
Athletes (track and field) at the 1983 Pan American Games
Athletes (track and field) at the 1984 Summer Olympics
Canadian male racewalkers
Olympic track and field athletes of Canada
Sportspeople from Quebec
People from Mauricie
Pan American Games track and field athletes for Canada
Commonwealth Games medallists in athletics
Commonwealth Games silver medallists for Canada
Medallists at the 1982 Commonwealth Games